Cotti e mangiati (Cooked and eaten) is an Italian sitcom that aired on RAIUno in 2006. It starred Flavio Insinna as the lead character, Franco Mancini, a married car rental dealer, and father of two teenagers. The show performed poorly in ratings; however since episodes were only 5 minutes in length, 75 episodes were aired. Each dealt with family issues like teenage pregnancy, peer pressure, etc.

2006 Italian television series debuts
2006 Italian television series endings
Italian comedy television series
2000s Italian television series
RAI original programming